Grevillea stenostachya is a species of flowering plant in the family Proteaceae and is endemic to the west of Western Australia. It is a compact shrub with pinnatipartite to almost pinnatisect leaves with 3 to 5 lobes, the end lobes cylindrical and sharply pointed, and greenish-white to creamy yellow flowers with a cream-coloured to yellow style.

Description

Taxonomy
Grevillea stenostachya was first formally described in 1936 by Charles Gardner in the Journal of the Royal Society of Western Australia from specimens he collected with William Blackall east of Meeberrie homestead, near the Murchison River in 1931. The specific epithet (stenostachya) means "narrow flower spike".

Distribution and habitat
This grevillea grows in scub or mallee between Hamelin Pool, Meekatharra and the Murchison River in the Coolgardie, Geraldton Sandplains, Murchison and Yalgoo bioregions in the west of western Western Australia.

Conservation status
Grevillea stenomera is listed as "not threatened" by the Western Australian Government Department of Biodiversity, Conservation and Attractions.

See also
 List of Grevillea species

References

stenostachya
Proteales of Australia
Eudicots of Western Australia
Plants described in 1936
Taxa named by Charles Gardner